Cruddas is a surname, a variant of the Scottish surname Carruthers. Notable people with the surname include: 

 Audrey Cruddas (1912–1979), British costume designer
 Bernard Cruddas (1882–1959), British Conservative politician
 Jon Cruddas (born 1962), British Labour politician
 Peter Cruddas (born 1953), British banker and Conservative politician
 Ralph Cruddas (1900–1979), British military officer
 Sarah Cruddas (born 1984), British journalist

Surnames
English-language surnames